Miz's first Japanese album, Say It's Forever, contains her first two Japanese singles—a-sides and b-sides—as Miz, New Day and Waiting For. If You Run was used as an ending theme for the docchi no ryouri SHOW.

Track listing
"New Day"
"Waiting For"
"What's Going On"
"If You Run"
"Interlude"
"Confusion"
"Dreams"
"Not You"
"Say It's Forever"
"Circles"
""What's It to You?!""
"In The Dark"
"Got It"

Swedish Diary DVD
New Day (Video clip)
Waiting For (Video clip)
at Gotland (Slideshow)
at Stockholm (Slideshow)

2004 albums
Victor Entertainment albums